Slow Motion Riot is the third studio album by American hardcore punk band, 98 Mute. It was released on Epitaph Records on June 6, 2000. It followed their 1998 album, Class Of 98, and in 2002, After the Fall marked their swansong as they split up shortly afterwards.

Overview
The band's musical development saw them slow down and lengthen their songs considerably. The guitars are heavier and have a more downtuned tone. The lyrics have been variously described as "uplifting", "feel good" and "positive".

Track listing
All songs written by 98 Mute
"Slow Motion Riot" – 2:57
"Could This Be" – 3:15
"Hit You Back" – 3:23
"Fight Of Your Life" – 3:09
"If We Quit" – 2:54
"Send In The Clowns" – 3:24
"Survive" – 2:44
"Judge & Jury" – 3:22
"Crack" – 2:44
"Simpler Days" – 3:11
"Never Forget" – 3:12
"You Can't Lose" – 3:26
"Count On Me" – 2:43
"Wounds" – 3:28
"It's Your Move" – 3:42

Personnel
 Pat Ivie – vocals
 Jason Page – guitar
 Doug Weems – bass
 Justin Thirsk – drums
 Recorded at Stall #2, Redondo Beach, California, USA
 Produced and mixed by Fletcher Dragge and Darian Rundall
 Engineered by Darian Rundall
 Mastered at Oasis Mastering

References

External links
98 Mute official website
Epitaph Records band page
Theologian Records website

2000 albums
98 Mute albums
Epitaph Records albums